Luz Rodriguez (born 27 May 1991) is a Mexican footballer who plays for Estudiantes de Mérida in Venezuela.

Career

Rodriguez started his senior career with C. F. Millonarios de la Joya. After that, he played for Excelsior, Potroes UAEM, and Miami United. In 2016, he signed for Estudiantes de Mérida in the Venezuelan Primera División, where he has made seventy-three appearances and scored sixteen goals.

References

External links 
 Venezuela, the paradise of a Mexican
 A national rocket; the globetrotter 
 "Refugee" in Venezuela 
 Mexican wants to demonstrate Aztec talent in Venezuela 
 Who is Luz Rodríguez, the only Mexican who plays the Libertadores 2020?
 The only Mexican in Copa Libertadores starts the dream against Racing this Thursday

Living people
1991 births
Mexican footballers
Association football forwards
Venezuelan Primera División players
Estudiantes de Mérida players
Mexican expatriate footballers
Expatriate footballers in Venezuela
Potros UAEM footballers